Donnell L. Turner (born January 8, 1973) is an American actor best known for his portrayal of Curtis Ashford on the ABC daytime soap opera, General Hospital. He has one daughter, Whitney Mayo who resides in Spokane, WA.

Personal life
Turner was born on January 8, 1973, in Tacoma, Washington. Turner's brother Ejay "Blunt" Turner is a member of the 1990s Contemporary R&B group, DRS. His family relocated to Chicago when Donnell was still a baby. As a child, Turner relocated to Redding, California, with his mother and brother, where they were the only African American family in the neighborhood.

Turner fell in love with performing as a child participating in church plays. In high school, he played basketball and played trumpet in band. Turner has a cat, Josephine "Josie" Baker, named after the eponymous late singer.
 Turner has studied martial arts since the age of 10.5 and explained that it helped him in his acting career. He also enjoys knife combat, nunchaku, yoga, kickboxing, and firearms training.

Career
Turner briefly played semi-pro basketball but quit to act full-time. In 2001, Turner moved to Los Angeles and eventually started modeling and commercial work for several major brands including Nike, Pepsi, Coca-Cola, Bud Light, Coors, Mercedes-Benz, Disney and AT&T. As of 2016, he has appeared in over 100 commercials. Turner also found work as a production assistant and stunt work for shows like ER where he doubled for Eriq La Salle and Criminal Minds where he doubled for Shemar Moore. Turner later doubled for Jesse L. Martin in the musical, Rent. Turner also found work as a background artist. In 2010, Turner appeared on Days of Our Lives as Dr. Aiden Williams opposite Kristian Alfonso. Turner who grew up watching General Hospital started writing to casting director Mark Teschner in the 1990s and first auditioned for the series in 2014. On October 29, 2015, he signed on to portray Curtis Ashford.

Charitable works
Turner also works as a motivational speaker and speaks with college and high school students, as well as religious and professional association audiences. Turner also has a mentoring program known as the "Turnround Project." On April 2, 2016, Turner was the celebrity guest speaker at the Autism Speaks Walk Now event.

Filmography

References

External links
 

1973 births
American male soap opera actors
Background artists
Living people
American male television actors
American motivational speakers
Male actors from Tacoma, Washington